The St. Lucie County Regional History Center (formerly known as the St. Lucie County Historical Museum) is located at 414 Seaway Drive, Fort Pierce, Florida.  The Museum opened September 17, 1968 under the auspices of the St. Lucie County Historical Commission. In 1988 the supervision of the Museum was transferred to the Leisure Services/Parks and Recreation Department of St. Lucie County. The Museum is currently run by the volunteers of the St. Lucie Historical Society.

Notes

External links
St. Lucie County Regional History Center - official website

Fort Pierce, Florida
Historic house museums in Florida
History museums in Florida
Museums in St. Lucie County, Florida
Museums established in 1968
1968 establishments in Florida